Captain Dugald Malcolm, CMG CVO TD (22 December 1917 – 16 February 2000) was a British diplomat, Her Britannic Majesty's Envoy Extraordinary and Minister Plenipotentiary to the Holy See 1975-1977.

Malcolm was born in 1917, the son of Major-General Sir Neill Malcolm, and educated at Eton College and New College, Oxford. After serving in the Argyll and Sutherland Highlanders in the Second World War, he joined the Foreign Office in 1945.

He was Her Majesty's Vice-Marshal of the Diplomatic Corps 1957-1965, then Ambassador to Luxembourg 1966-1970, and Ambassador to Panama 1971-1974. From 1975 to 1977 served as Minister Plenipotentiary to the Vatican.

Malcolm was a member of the Queen's Bodyguard for Scotland (Royal Company of Archers).

See also
British Ambassadors to the Holy See.

References
MALCOLM, Dugald, Who Was Who, A & C Black, 1920–2008; online edn, Oxford University Press, Dec 2007, accessed 16 Feb 2012

1917 births
2000 deaths
People educated at Eton College
Alumni of New College, Oxford
Argyll and Sutherland Highlanders officers
Ambassadors of the United Kingdom to the Holy See
Ambassadors of the United Kingdom to Luxembourg
Ambassadors of the United Kingdom to Panama
Members of the Royal Company of Archers
Commanders Crosses of the Order of Merit of the Federal Republic of Germany